Ratu Inoke Takiveikata (born 1947) is a Fijian high chief and former politician.  Since 1997 he has held the title of Qaranivalu, a senior chiefly title in Naitasiri Province.  He served in the interim Cabinet of Prime Minister Laisenia Qarase as Minister for Regional Development and Multi-ethnic Affairs, in 2000 and 2001, when he was appointed to the Senate and sworn in on 14 September.

References

1949 births
Living people
Fijian chiefs
I-Taukei Fijian members of the Senate (Fiji)
Politicians from Naitasiri Province